In enzymology, an opine dehydrogenase is an enzyme that catalyzes the chemical reaction

(2S)-2-{[1-(R)-carboxyethyl]amino}pentanoate + NAD+ + H2O  L-2-aminopentanoic acid + pyruvate + NADH + H+

The 3 substrates of this enzyme are [[(2S)-2-{[1-(R)-carboxyethyl]amino}pentanoate]], NAD+, and H2O, whereas its 4 products are L-2-aminopentanoic acid, pyruvate, NADH, and H+.

This enzyme belongs to the family of oxidoreductases, specifically those acting on the CH-NH group of donors with NAD+ or NADP+ as acceptor.  The systematic name of this enzyme class is (2S)-2-{[1-(R)-carboxyethyl]amino}pentanoate:NAD+ oxidoreductase (L-aminopentanoate-forming). Other names in common use include (2S)-2-{[1-(R)-carboxyethyl]amino}pentanoate dehydrogenase (NAD+,, and L-aminopentanoate-forming).

References

 
 
 

EC 1.5.1
NADH-dependent enzymes
Enzymes of unknown structure